George Henry Abbott (August 3, 1911 – December 31, 1996) was a Canadian professional ice hockey goaltender who played in one National Hockey League game for the Boston Bruins during the 1943–44 NHL season. He was born in Sydenham, Ontario, but grew up in Hamilton, Ontario.

Playing career
Abbott was the practice goaltender for the Toronto Maple Leafs as well as a minister.  He played for the Dunnville Mudcats before his career ended during a practice session with the Hamilton Tigers when a deflected puck struck him in the eye.  On November 27, 1943, the Maple Leafs were due to play the Boston Bruins where the Bruins' starting goaltender Bert Gardiner suffered from illness and couldn't play.  Bruins coach Art Ross borrowed Abbott to play for the night. Toronto went on to win the game 7-3 as Abbott faced 52 shots. He was knocked out for a few minutes by a shot from Babe Pratt.

Abbott was known as "The Preacher," as he became a Baptist minister after giving up hockey after his injury. He was assigned to the Toronto area during 1943 and the Leafs took him on as a practice goalie.

Career statistics

See also
List of players who played only one game in the NHL

References

External links

1911 births
1996 deaths
Boston Bruins players
Canadian ice hockey goaltenders
Ice hockey people from Ontario
People from Frontenac County
Sportspeople from Hamilton, Ontario